Stanislav Chalaev (born 16 October 1986) is a weightlifter from New Zealand.

At the 2010 Commonwealth Games he won the silver medal in the 105 kg class. Chalaev again won silver at the 2014 Commonwealth Games in the same weight class.

External links 

Delhi Commonwealth Games 2010 Snatch and Grab

Living people
New Zealand male weightlifters
Commonwealth Games silver medallists for New Zealand
Weightlifters at the 2010 Commonwealth Games
Weightlifters at the 2014 Commonwealth Games
1986 births
People from Tomsk
Russian emigrants to New Zealand
People educated at Auckland Grammar School
Commonwealth Games medallists in weightlifting
Medallists at the 2010 Commonwealth Games
Medallists at the 2014 Commonwealth Games